Synairgie was a French aircraft manufacturer based in Montauban. The company specialized in the design and manufacture of ultralight aircraft.

In the 1990s the company produced more than 150 copies of the Best Off Skyranger as the Synairgie Skyranger. They went on to develop a derivative design, the Synairgie Jet Ranger, a tandem two seat microlight. At least 12 Jet Rangers were completed and flown.

Aircraft

References

Defunct aircraft manufacturers of France
Homebuilt aircraft